William Lipkind (December 17, 1904, New York City – October 2, 1974) was an American writer most famous for his children's picture book collaborations with Nicholas Mordvinoff, under the pseudonym Will (jointly Nicolas and Will). Before his writing and illustrating career, he was already an established anthropologist, graduating from Columbia University in 1937. He earned a master’s in English literature. His undergraduate degree was from City College of New York in 1927. His doctorate was in anthropology.

Career

Writing
In 1947, he wrote Finders Keepers, published by Harcourt Brace and winner of the 1951 Caldecott Medal.

Anthropology 
Beginning in 1939, Lipkind spent two years in Brazil studying two Indian tribes.  His research resulted in a grammar and dictionary upon his return in the US. One publication was called Winnebago Grammar.. It began as his dissertation at Columbia in 1944.

Teaching
Lipkind taught anthropology at New York University and at Hunter College, children’s literature.

References

External links
http://qa.britannica.com/ebi/article-9315225

 

 

1904 births
1974 deaths
American illustrators
American children's writers
20th-century American anthropologists
Columbia Graduate School of Arts and Sciences alumni
City College of New York alumni
Writers from New York City
New York University faculty
Hunter College faculty